In the Catholic Church, an apostolic visitor (or Apostolic Visitator; Italian: Visitatore apostolico) is a papal representative with a transient mission to perform a canonical visitation of relatively short duration.  The visitor is deputed to investigate a special circumstance in a diocese or country, and to submit a report to the Holy See at the conclusion of the investigation.

History 
Apostolic visitors are church officials whom canonists commonly class with papal legates. Visitors differ from other Apostolic delegates, principally in this, that their mission is only transient and of comparatively short duration.

In ancient times, the popes generally exercised their right of inspecting the dioceses of various countries through their nuncios or delegates (c. 1, Extravag. Comm. de Consuet. I, 1; c. 17, X, de Cens. III, 39), though they occasionally, even in the primitive ages, sent special visitors.

In the modern time, the mission of papal nuncios is rather of a diplomatic than of a visitatorial character. Visitors are, however, deputed by the pope for special emergencies and not at stated intervals. Their duty is to inspect the state of the Church in the country confided to them and then to draw up a report to the Holy See. At times, this visitation is made with the same attention to details as is an episcopal visitation.

Regular clergy 
Visitors Apostolic are also appointed to visit the various provinces of a religious order, whenever, in the judgment of the pope, this becomes useful or necessary. In all cases of Apostolic visitation, the pope, through delegates, is putting into effect the supreme and immediate jurisdiction which is his for any and every part of the Church. The exact powers of a visitor can be known only from his brief of delegation. His office ceases as soon as he has submitted his report to the Holy See through the Consistorial Congregation.

The Commission of the Apostolic Visitation 

For the city of Rome itself there is a permanent Commission of the Apostolic Visitation. Established by Urban VIII as one of the Roman congregations under the presidency of the cardinal vicar, it was changed into a commission by Pope Pius X through the Constitution "Sapienti Consilio" (29 June 1908). These Apostolic visitors annually inspect the parishes and institutions of Rome and report on their spiritual and financial condition. They pay special attention to the fulfilment of the obligations springing from pious foundations and legacies for Masses and chaplaincies.

Eastern Catholic Apostolic Visitors 
In Eastern Catholic (non-Latin) churches, the office of apostolic visitor can be indefinite and the closest thing to an ordinary for communities in regions which have not (yet) been organized into any ordinary jurisdiction. Although there is a history of apostolic visitors in the Belarusian Greek Catholic Church, Eastern Catholic apostolic visitors are generally found in the major Eastern Catholic churches.

Apostolic Visitors in the Belarusian Greek Catholic Church 
Because the Belarusian Greek Catholic Church (Byzantine Rite) remains unorganized in terms of structural polity, with no proper jurisdictions of its own erected, since 1960 the Pope has entrusted the pastoral care of Belarusian Greek Catholics to a series of Apostolic Visitors. These apostolic visitors have thus served as the only hierarchs of the Belarusian Greek Catholic Church during this time period.
 Bishop Ceslaus Sipovich served as Apostolic Visitor for the Belarusian Greek-Catholic faithful abroad (outside of Belarus) from 1960 until his death in 1981.
 Bishop Uladzimir Tarasevich served as Apostolic Visitor for the Belarusian Greek-Catholic faithful abroad from 1983 until his death in 1986.
 Father Alexander Nadson served as Apostolic Visitor for the Belarusian Greek-Catholic faithful abroad from 1986 until his death in 2015.
 Father Sergiusz Gajek has served as Apostolic Visitor for the Belarusian Greek-Catholic faithful in Belarus since 1994.

Apostolic Visitors in the Major Eastern Catholic Churches 
In recent years, nearly all of the Patriarchal and Major Archiepiscopal Eastern Catholic churches (except the Coptic) have made use of apostolic visitors, mostly in Europe and the Americas. This has sometimes served as a prelude to the creation of an apostolic exarchate or an eparchy. The apostolic visitors are almost always bishops, but only a few of them have a full-time mandate as apostolic visitors. Most of them perform their visitation in addition to some other more primary ecclesiastical role, whether as a residential bishop, an auxiliary bishop, a curial bishop, or their particular church's procurator at Rome.

Armenian Catholic Church 
Since 1986, the Armenian Catholic eparchs of Paris (whose eparchy covers all of France) have served as Apostolic Visitor in Western Europe of the Armenians:
 Bishop Grégoire Ghabroyan (Eparch of Paris, 1986–2013), Apostolic Visitor in Western Europe, 30 June 1986 – 8 June 2013
 Bishop Jean Teyrouz (Eparch of Paris, 2013–2018), Apostolic Visitor in Western Europe, 8 June 2013 – 23 June 2018
 Bishop Elie Yéghia Yéghiayan (Eparch of Paris, 2018–present), Apostolic Visitor in Western Europe, 23 June 2018 – present

Chaldean Catholic Church 
The Chaldean Catholic Church has had an Apostolic Visitor in Europe of the Chaldeans since 2005:
 Monsignor Philip B. Najim (Procurator at Rome, 2001–2014), Apostolic Visitor in Europe, 4 July 2005 – 20 July 2013 
 Archbishop Ramzi Garmou (Metropolitan Archbishop of Tehran, 1999–present), Apostolic Visitor in Europe, 20 July 2013 – 19 November 2016 
 Bishop Saad Sirop, Apostolic Visitor in Europe, 19 November 2016 – present

Melkite Greek Catholic Church 
The Melkite Greek Catholic Church currently has one apostolic visitor:
 Archbishop Jean-Clément Jeanbart (Metropolitan Archbishop of Aleppo, 1995–present), Apostolic Visitor in Western Europe, 31 December 1999 – present

Romanian Greek Catholic Church 
The Romanian Greek Catholic Church currently has one apostolic visitor:
 Father Cristian Dumitru Crişan, Apostolic Visitor in Western Europe, 9 April 2018 – present

Syriac Catholic Church 
The Syriac Catholic Church currently has two Apostolic Visitors:
 Archbishop Jules Mikhael Al-Jamil (Procurator at Rome, 1997–2012), Apostolic Visitor in Western Europe, 2002 – 3 December 2012 
 Archbishop Basile Georges Casmoussa (Bishop of the Curia, 2011–present), Apostolic Visitor in Western Europe, 13 January 2014 – 21 June 2017; Apostolic Visitor in Australia, 21 June 2017 – present 
 Father Rami Al-Kabalan, Apostolic Visitor in Western Europe, 21 June 2017 – present

Syriac Maronite Church 
The Syriac Maronite Church currently has five apostolic visitors:
 Bishop Georges Chihane (Eparch of Cairo, 2012–present), Apostolic Visitor in Northern Africa, 13 January 2014 – present
 Bishop Francois Eid (Procurator at Rome, 2012–2019), Apostolic Visitor in Bulgaria and Romania and Apostolic Visitor in Greece, 13 April 2015 – 11 October 2018
 Archbishop Joseph Soueif (Archbishop of Cyprus, 2008–present), Apostolic Visitor in Greece, 11 October 2018 – present
 Bishop Michel Aoun (Eparch of Byblos, 2012–present), Apostolic Visitor in Bulgaria and Romania, 11 October 2018 – present
 Bishop Nasser Gemayel (Eparch of Paris, 2012–present), Apostolic Visitor in Western and Northern Europe, 21 July 2012 – present
 Bishop Simon Faddoul (Apostolic Exarch of Western and Central Africa, 2014–2018; Eparch of the Annunciation, 2018–present), Apostolic Visitor in Southern Africa, 13 January 2014 – present

Syro-Malabar Catholic Church 
The Syro-Malabar Catholic Church has had a number of apostolic visitors over the last several decades, including two at present:
 Bishop Jacob Angadiath (Eparch of Chicago, 2001–present), Apostolic Visitor in Canada, 16 February 2001 – 6 August 2015 
 Bishop Stephen Chirappanath (Procurator at Rome, 2012–present), Apostolic Visitor in Europe, 28 July 2016 – present 
 Bishop Bosco Puthur (Eparch of Melbourne, 2013–present), Apostolic Visitor in New Zealand, 23 December 2013 – present 
 Archbishop Antony Padiyara (Metropolitan Archbishop of Changanaserry, 1970–1985), Apostolic Visitor in India outside the proper territory, 8 September 1978 – 23 April 1985 
 Bishop Gratian Mundadan (Eparch of Bijnor, 1977–2009), Apostolic Visitor in India outside the proper territory, 15 July 2006 – 11 January 2014 
 Bishop Raphael Thattil (Auxiliary Bishop of Thrissur, 2010–2017), Apostolic Visitor in India outside the proper territory, 11 January 2014 – 10 October 2017

Syro-Malankara Catholic Church 
The Syro-Malankara Catholic Church has had a number of apostolic visitors over the last few decades, three of whom served as apostolic visitors for two different regions simultaneously. Partly due to the canonical erection of several new eparchies and apostolic exarchates, however, there are currently no Syro-Malankara apostolic visitors at present:
 Bishop Isaac Mar Cleemis (Auxiliary Bishop of Trivandrum, 2001–2003), Apostolic Visitor in North America and Apostolic Visitor in Europe, 18 June 2001 – 11 September 2003 
 Bishop Joseph Mar Thomas (Auxiliary Bishop of Trivandrum, 2005–2010), Apostolic Visitor in North America and Apostolic Visitor in Europe, 5 January 2005 – 25 January 2010  
 Bishop Thomas Mar Eusebius (Apostolic Exarch of the United States, 2010–2016; Eparch of the United States and Canada, 2016–2017), Apostolic Visitor in Canada, 14 July 2010 – 4 January 2016; Apostolic Visitor in Europe, 14 July 2010 – 5 August 2017 
 Bishop John Kochuthundil (Bishop of the Curia, 2017–present), Apostolic Visitor in Europe, 5 August 2017 – 10 April 2018 
 Bishop Jacob Mar Barnabas, Apostolic Visitor in India outside the proper territory, 7 February 2007 – 26 March 2015

Ukrainian Greek Catholic Church 
The Ukrainian Greek Catholic Church had several apostolic visitors in Western Europe after the end of World War II and currently has three apostolic visitors:
 Archbishop Ivan Buchko, Apostolic Visitor in Western Europe, 28 July 1945 – 29 September 1971
 Bishop Myroslav Marusyn, Apostolic Visitor in Western Europe, 27 June 1974 – 14 September 1982 
 Bishop Hlib Lonchyna (Procurator at Rome, 2003–2006; Eparch of London, 2009–present), Apostolic Visitor in Italy, 14 January 2003 – 7 January 2009; Apostolic Visitor in Spain, 4 March 2004 – 7 January 2009; Apostolic Visitor in Ireland, 4 March 2004 – present 
 Bishop Dionisio Lachovicz, Apostolic Visitor in Italy and Spain, 19 January 2009 – present 
 Bishop Daniel Kozelinski Netto (Eparch of Buenos Aires, 2011–present), Apostolic Visitor in Uruguay, Paraguay, Chile, and Venezuela, 12 January 2013 – present

See also 

 Canonical visitation
 Provincial episcopal visitor
 Quinquennial Visit Ad Limina

Notes

References

Citations

Sources 

  

Catholic missions
Catholic ecclesiastical titles